Dominick F. Murphy ( – 1 June 2009) was an Irish Labour Party politician and trade union official. He was a member of Seanad Éireann from 1954 to 1969. He was first elected to the 8th Seanad in 1954 by the Labour Panel, and was re-elected at the 1957, 1961 and 1965 elections. He lost his seat at the 1969 Seanad election.

He was a member of the Transport Salaried Staffs' Association and was vice president (1963–1964) and president (1964–1965) of the Irish Congress of Trade Unions.

References

1910s births
2009 deaths

Year of birth uncertain
Members of the 8th Seanad
Members of the 9th Seanad
Members of the 10th Seanad
Members of the 11th Seanad
Labour Party (Ireland) senators
Politicians from County Cork
Irish trade unionists
Presidents of the Irish Congress of Trade Unions